Uppalaguptam mandal is one of the 22 mandals in Konaseema district of Andhra Pradesh. As per census 2011, there are 14 villages in this mandal.

Demographics 
Uppalaguptam mandal has total population of 59,931 as per the 2011 Census out of which 30,285 are males while 29,646 are females. The average sex ratio is 979. The total literacy rate is 74%.

Towns and villages

Villages 
1. Bheemanapalle
2. Chinagedavalli
3. Gollavilli
4. Gopavaram
5. Kunavaram
6. Munipalle
7. Nangavaram
8. Nimmakayala Kothapalle
9. Pedagadavilli
10. Sannavalli
11. Surasaniyanam
12. T. Challapalle
13. Uppalaguptam
14. Vilasavilli

See also 
List of mandals in Andhra Pradesh

References 

Mandals in Konaseema district
Mandals in Andhra Pradesh